The 2019 Conference Carolinas men's volleyball tournament was the men's volleyball tournament for Conference Carolinas during the 2019 NCAA Division I & II men's volleyball season. It was held April 13 through April 18, 2019 at campus sites. The winner received the conference's automatic bid to the 2019 NCAA Volleyball Tournament.

Seeds
Eight of the nine teams are eligible for the postseason, with the highest seed hosting each round. Teams are seeded by record within the conference, with a tiebreaker system to seed teams with identical conference records.

Schedule and results

Bracket

The win clinched Barton's second trip to the NCAA Tournament.

References

2019 Conference Carolinas men's volleyball season
2019 NCAA Division I & II men's volleyball season
Volleyball competitions in the United States